Rainer Holzhaider (born 2 August 1956) is an Austrian rower. He competed in the men's quadruple sculls event at the 1980 Summer Olympics.

References

1956 births
Living people
Austrian male rowers
Olympic rowers of Austria
Rowers at the 1980 Summer Olympics
People from Gmunden
Sportspeople from Upper Austria